The Queen is the second studio album by Swedish singer Velvet. Her official website and her label Bonnier confirmed that The Queen would be released on March 18, 2009. The album features fourteen tracks including the singles "Fix Me", "Chemistry", "Déjà Vu", "Take My Body Close" and "The Queen". Also included is a cover of Ultravox's 1984 single "Dancing with Tears in My Eyes".

Track listing
"The Queen" (Tony Nilsson, Henrik Janson) – 2:56
"Chemistry" (Niklas Pettersson, Tony Marty) – 2:59
"Take My Body Close" (Mathias Kallenberger, Andreas Berlin) – 3:33
"Sound of Music" (Anton Malmberg Hard, F. Persson, S. Engblom) – 3:17
"Radio Star" (Tony Nilsson) – 3:03
"My Rhythm" (Pettersson, M. Albertsson) – 3:35
"Play" (Pettersson, Albertsson) – 4:10
"Come into the Night" (Kallenberger, Berlin) – 3:27
"Déjà Vu" (J. Persson, N. Molinder, P. Ankarberg, N. Valsamidis, David Jassy, F. Larsson) – 3:05
"Dancing with Tears in My Eyes" (M. Ure, B. Currie, W. Cann, C. Allen) – 3:23
"Fix Me" (Pettersson) – 3:05
"My Destiny" (Kallenberger, Berlin) – 4:00
"The Queen" [Remix] (Tony Nilsson, Henrik Janson) – 3:38
"Chemistry" [Digital Dog Remix] (Pettersson, Marty) – 6:14

Personnel
Andreas Berlin – production, mixing, guitar
Anton Malmberg Hard – production, mixing
Fredrik Larson – production
Henke Jonsson – mastering
Jenny Petersson – vocals
Johan Bejerholm – mixing
Mathias Kallenberger – production, mixing
Nicholas Mace – production, programming, remixing, keyboard
Niklas Pettersson – production, mixing
Niko Valsamidis – production
Nathalie Berzelius – hair and make up
Robert Uhlmann – production
Stephen Cornish – production, programming, remixing, keyboard
Tony Nilsson – production, remixing
Twin – production, arrangement, mixing

Charts
The Queen debuted on the Swedish Albums Chart at number 44, skipped a week, and then returned to the chart at number 53. After a two-week absence, the album returned at number 33, creating a new peak. It also charted in Norway where it entered the charts at number 40 before moving up to 34 and then 20.

Singles

References

External links
Official Website

2009 albums
Velvet (singer) albums